Quinto may refer to:

People
 Quinto (name), list of people with the name

Places
Quinto (Ponce), a barrio in Puerto Rico
Quinto, Aragon, a municipality in the province of Zaragoza, Spain
Quinto, Ticino, a municipality in Switzerland
In Italy:
Quinto Vercellese, Province of Vercelli, Piedmont
Quinto Vicentino, Province of Vicenza, Veneto
Quinto di Treviso, Province of Treviso, Veneto
 Quinto River, in Argentina
 Pio Quinto, desert in Nicaragua

Other uses 
 Quinto (drum), the smallest of the conga drums used in the music of Cuba
 Quinto, a five-digit numbers game offered by the Pennsylvania Lottery, in the United States
 Quinto, a 1960s 3M bookshelf game